Col Buchanan (born 1973 Lisburn, Northern Ireland) is a Northern Irish fantasy writer. His first two books are Farlander and Stands a Shadow.

He lives in Lancaster, England.

Works 
Heart of the World series
 Farlander (March 2010)
 Stands a Shadow (July 2011)
 The Black Dream (March 2015)
 Fierce Gods (February 2017)

Reviews

"‘Farlander’ – Col Buchanan (Tor UK)", Graeme's Fantasy Book Review, 25 February 2010
"Farlander (2010), A novel by Col Buchanan", Fantastic Fiction
Barnes & Noble Farlander (Tor 2010)

References

External links
 Interview with Col Buchanan

Living people
1973 births
British fantasy writers